Bergo or Bergö is a surname. Notable people with this surname include:

Bergo
 Arthur Bergo (born 1994), Brazilian rugby player
 Magnar Lund Bergo (born 1949), Norwegian politician
 Olav Terje Bergo (born 1946), Norwegian newspaper editor

Bergö
 Aino Bergö (1915–1944), Swedish ballerina, opera singer and film actress

See also
Bergö, an island and former municipality of Finland, in the Coastal Ostrobothnia region
Bergön, an island in the northwest of the Swedish sector of the Bay of Bothnia, in the Kalix archipelago